Väsby Simsällskap is a swim team from Upplands Väsby north of Stockholm, Sweden. It was founded in 1964 and the home pool is Vilundabadet. Väsby SS is one of the major Swedish swim teams finishing in the top by medals on the latest Swedish Swimming Championships. The head coach is Ulrika Sandmark.

Swimmers
Daniel Carlsson (1992–2003)
Josefin Lillhage (1999-)
Petra Granlund (2006-)
Roberts Raudzins (2005-)

External links
Väsby SS's Official Homepage (In Swedish)

Swimming clubs in Sweden
Sports clubs established in 1964
Sporting clubs in Stockholm
1964 establishments in Sweden